Nikita Korzun (born 6 March 1995) is a Belarusian professional football player who currently plays for Shakhtyor Soligorsk.

Club career

Dinamo Minsk
A product of the Dinamo Minsk youth system, Korzun made his senior debut on 17 November 2012, when he came on as a stoppage-time substitute in a 2-0 away victory against FC Torpedo-BelAZ Zhodino. Over the next 3 seasons, he went on to make 67 appearances for the club across all tournaments.

Dynamo Kyiv
On 1 February 2016, Korzun signed a 5-year contract with Ukrainian club Dynamo Kyiv. However, he struggled to win a regular place in the side, and didn't make his debut until 14 May 2016 (4-1 road victory against FC Metalist Kharkiv). Over the next two seasons, Korzun played sparingly, mostly as a substitute.

On 24 July 2018, it was announced that Korzun would return to Dinamo Minsk on loan, until the end of the season.

In January 2019, he joined Saudi team Al-Fateh on loan until January 2020.

International career

Korzun represented Belarus at all levels of youth football. He made his senior team debut on 27 May 2016 in Belfast, in a 3-0 friendly loss to Northern Ireland.

Honours

Club
Dynamo Kyiv
Ukrainian Premier League: 2015–16
Ukrainian Super Cup: 2016

Shakhtyor Soligorsk
Belarusian Premier League: 2020, 2021, 2022
Belarusian Super Cup: 2021, 2023

References

External links
 
 
 Profile at Dinamo Minsk website

1995 births
Living people
Footballers from Minsk
Belarusian footballers
Association football midfielders
Belarus international footballers
Belarusian expatriate footballers
Ukrainian Premier League players
Saudi Professional League players
Liga Portugal 2 players
FC Dinamo Minsk players
FC Dynamo Kyiv players
Al-Fateh SC players
U.D. Vilafranquense players
FC Shakhtyor Soligorsk players
Expatriate footballers in Saudi Arabia
Expatriate footballers in Portugal
Expatriate footballers in Ukraine
Belarusian expatriate sportspeople in Saudi Arabia
Belarusian expatriate sportspeople in Portugal
Belarusian expatriate sportspeople in Ukraine